Pete Rodriguez (July 25, 1940November 30, 2014) was an American football coach of Mexican American descent.

College coaching career
Rodriguez broke into coaching as a graduate assistant at Arizona (1968–69) and later served as defensive coordinator at Western Illinois (1970–73), Florida State (1974–75), Iowa State (1976–78) and Northern Iowa (1986). He served as head coach at Western Illinois from 1979–82.

Professional coaching career

USFL
Rodriguez served as defensive line coach for the Michigan Panthers of the United States Football League from 1983-84. He was part of the USFL's first championship team, helping the Panthers to the title in 1983. He spent the  season as defensive line coach with the Denver Gold.

CFL

NFL
Rodriguez entered the National Football League as the Los Angeles Raiders special teams coach (1988–89). He served in a similar capacity with the Phoenix Cardinals (1990–93), Washington Redskins (1994–97), Seattle Seahawks (1998–2003) and, most recently, the Jacksonville Jaguars (2004–2006).

UFL
Rodriguez served as the special teams coach for the New York Sentinels of the United Football League in 2009.

Involvement with USC
In July, 2010 the Los Angeles Times reported that he was the coach hired by Pete Carroll as a special consultant for USC's kickers during the 2008 football season.  The use of additional coach was one of the items that the NCAA found to be a Major Violation and subjected USC to the "Loss of institutional control" finding.  Carroll had defended the hiring as being done with the knowledge of the USC compliance staff however the compliance staff reported that this was not the case.

Personal
One of Rodriguez's daughters, Regina M. Rodriguez, is an attorney who was nominated multiple times to serves as a federal judge on the United States District Court for the District of Colorado.

Death
Rodriguez died in San Diego on November 30, 2014, of a complication following an undisclosed surgery, after being in a coma for months.

Head coaching record

References

1940 births
2014 deaths
American sportspeople of Mexican descent
Arizona Wildcats football coaches
Florida State Seminoles football coaches
Iowa State Cyclones football coaches
Jacksonville Jaguars coaches
Los Angeles Raiders coaches
New York Sentinels coaches
Ottawa Rough Riders coaches
Phoenix Cardinals coaches
Seattle Seahawks coaches
United States Football League coaches
Washington Redskins coaches
Western Illinois Leathernecks football coaches
Western Colorado University alumni